Body/Antibody is a 2007 American comedy-drama film directed by Kerry Douglas Dye and Jordan Hoffman, starring Robert Gomes, Leslie Kendall Dye and Frank Deal.

Cast
 Robert Gomes as Kip Polyard
 Leslie Kendall Dye as Celine
 Frank Deal as Andy
 Debbie Gibson as The Caseworker
 Saidah Arrika Ekulona as Dorothy
 Antony Hagopian as Tony
 Pamelyn Chee as 'Injustice!' Woman
 Irma St. Paule as Woman at Bus Stop

Reception
Kurt Dahlke of DVD Talk rated the film 3.5 stars out of 5 and wrote that "smart scripting and great performances make this rise above the straight-to-DVD ranks, begging to be on the big screen." Richard van Oosterom of See Magazine rated the film 3.5 stars out of 5 and called the performances "understated and natural".

Elizabeth Chorney-Booth of Fast Forward Weekly called the performances "textured" and the atmosphere "sparse but tense". Dave Jaffer of Hour Community wrote that the film's "stark whiteness injects a palpable sense of order and cleanliness to the proceedings, which is of course sullied by a claustrophobic and bloody third act that exposes how base our darker desires really are."

Marya Summers of New Times Broward-Palm Beach wrote that the film "doesn't cut important corners and makes few mistakes".

References

External links
 
 

American comedy-drama films
2007 comedy-drama films